Bernard R. Goggins (June 17, 1858 – September 2, 1937) was an American lawyer and the first mayor of Wisconsin Rapids, Wisconsin.

Early life
Bernard R. Goggins was born on June 17, 1858, in New Holstein, Wisconsin to Bridget and Hugh Goggins. In 1964, the Goggins family moved to Charlestown, Wisconsin. He attended Chilton High School in nearby Chilton. He completed a four-year course at Oshkosh teachers' college (now University of Wisconsin–Oshkosh) in June 1884. He later attended the University of Wisconsin Law School and graduated in June 1890. In December 1899, he joined the State Bar of Wisconsin.

Career
In November 1884, Goggins came to Grand Rapids, Wisconsin. After Oshkosh, he became principal at Howe High School in Grand Rapids from November 1884 to June 1888. After graduating from law school, he became partners with Herman C. Wipperman in Centralia.

In 1892, he was elected as district attorney of Wood County, Wisconsin, but lost re-election in 1894. One of Goggin's students at Howe High School, Theodore W. Brazeau, joined with Goggins to form the law firm Goggins & Brazeau on June 27, 1900. On August 1, 1923, R. B. Graves joined and the firm became Goggins, Brazeau, & Graves. After his death, the firm became Brazeau & Graves.

In April 1900, he became the first mayor of Wisconsin Rapids, Wisconsin, which had just been consolidated from Grand Rapids and Centralia. He only served one term.

In 1910, Goggins worked on a board of appraisers to appraise Eau Claire Water Works in Eau Claire, Wisconsin. During World War I, Goggins prosecuted alleged violators of the Espionage Act of 1917. On March 1, 1918, he was appointed the special assistant to the U.S. attorney general for the western district of Wisconsin to prosecute violators of the Act. Under Federal Judges A. L. Sanborn of Madison and Evan E. Evans of Chicago, he prosecuted espionage cases, including Judge John M. Becker of Monroe and Louis B. Nagler, former Wisconsin assistant secretary of state. He held this role until November 1, 1919. He also tried the United States's case against Ada Griffith for the White Slave Traffic Act, which reached the U.S. Supreme Court.

He also served as a member of the Wood County Board and Centralia School Board. He was a Democratic candidate for Wisconsin State Senate and was offered an appointment by Governor James O. Davidson to the Railroad Commission of Wisconsin, but declined.

He served as president of the Wisconsin State Bar Association from 1916 to 1917.

Personal life
Goggins married Elizabeth Hooten of Clemonsville, Winnebago County, Wisconsin on August 11, 1886. Together, they had six children, including Hugh W. Goggins, William A. Goggins and Robert S. Goggins. Goggins's son, Hugh W. Goggins, also worked in his father's law firm and served as district attorney of Wood County.

Death
Goggins died on September 2, 1937, at his home in Wisconsin Rapids.

References

1858 births
1937 deaths
People from New Holstein, Wisconsin
20th-century American lawyers
Wisconsin lawyers
District attorneys in Wisconsin
Mayors of places in Wisconsin
University of Wisconsin–Oshkosh alumni
University of Wisconsin Law School alumni